Egis or EGIS may refer to:

 An alternative spelling for aegis
 Egis Group, a French engineering and consulting group
 Erieye Ground Interface Segment, a military software package which is part of the Erieye radar system

See also